Lac d'Estaing is a lake in Hautes-Pyrénées, France. At an elevation of 1163 m, its surface area is 0.086 km².

Lakes of Hautes-Pyrénées